Bloodline is a feature film written, produced and directed by Matt Thompson. It stars Thompson himself, in addition to  Kimberly Alexander and Jesse Kristofferson. It follows his debut long feature Listen to Your Heart and is shot mainly on location in El Dorado, Placer and Sacramento counties.

Cast

References

External links

2011 films
2011 horror films
2010s English-language films